Wolfgang Friedrich Ischinger (born April 6, 1946) is a German diplomat who served as chairman of the Munich Security Conference from 2008 to 2022.

From 2001 to 2006, Ischinger was the German ambassador to the United States, and from 1998 to 2001, he was Staatssekretär (Deputy Foreign Minister) in Berlin. He was Germany's ambassador to the Court of St. James's (the United Kingdom) from 2006 to May, 2008. He was also Global Head of Government Relations of Allianz SE from March 2008 until December 2014. He serves on the supervisory board of Allianz Deutschland AG, on the European Advisory Board of Investcorp (London/New York) and on the governing board of the Stockholm International Peace Research Institute. He has been described as "Germany's best-connected former diplomat".

Early life and education
Ischinger was born in Beuren, Baden-Württemberg, near Stuttgart, Germany.  In 1963–64, he was an American Field Service foreign exchange student in Watseka, Illinois, where he graduated from the local high school in June 1964. After German Abitur, Ischinger studied law at the University of Bonn, Germany and the University of Geneva, Switzerland and obtained his law degree in 1972. He earned a master's degree from the Fletcher School of Law and Diplomacy in Medford, Massachusetts, in 1973.

Career
From 1973 to 1975, Ischinger served on the staff of the Secretary General of the United Nations in New York. He joined the German Foreign Service in 1975, and has served in Washington, D.C., Paris, and in a number of senior functions in the German Foreign Office. In 1982, he became personal assistant to Hans-Dietrich Genscher, West German foreign minister and leader of the Free Democratic Party.

From 1993 to 1995, Ischinger was director of the Policy Planning Staff under Foreign Minister Klaus Kinkel; from 1995 to 1998, as director general for political affairs (political director), Ischinger participated in a number of international negotiating processes, including the Bosnia Peace Talks at Dayton, Ohio, the negotiations concerning the NATO-Russia Founding Act, as well as the negotiations on EU and NATO enlargement and on the Kosovo crisis.

As Staatssekretär (deputy foreign minister) under Foreign Minister Joschka Fischer between 1998 and 2001, Ischinger represented Germany at numerous international and European conferences, including the 1999 G8 and EU summit meetings in Cologne/Germany and the 2000 Review Conference of the Treaty on the Non-Proliferation of Nuclear Weapons (NPT) at the United Nations in New York.

In 2007, Ischinger was the European Union Representative in the Troika negotiations on the future of Kosovo, which ended up leading to the declaration of independence of Kosovo and the recognition of Kosovo by most EU member countries, the United States, and a number of other countries, in February, 2008. Reportedly, Ischinger entered the talks "with only one goal and idea: for Kosovo to become independent in the end, with the Serbian authority's willing consent".

From 2019 until 2020, Ischinger co-chaired the Transatlantic Task Force of the German Marshall Fund and the Bundeskanzler-Helmut-Schmidt-Stiftung (BKHS), alongside Karen Donfried.

Ischinger has published widely on foreign policy, security, and arms control policy as well as on European and transatlantic issues.

Other activities

Corporate boards
 Investcorp, member of the international advisory board
 Kekst CNC, Member of the Global Advisory Board

Non-profit organizations
 American Academy in Berlin, member of the board of trustees
American Institute for Contemporary Germany Studies, member of the board of trustees
 AFS Germany (American Field Service), member of the board
 Atlantic Council of the United States, member of the board
 Atlantik-Brücke, member of the board
 Bonner Akademie für Forschung und Lehre praktischer Politik (BAPP), member of the board of trustees
 Bundesakademie für Sicherheitspolitik (BAKS), member of the board
 Club of Three, member of the steering group
 Council on Public Policy Berlin, member of the board
 Dahrendorf Forum, Member of the Committee
 EastWest Institute, member of the board
 Fletcher School of Law and Diplomacy, board of overseers
 German Institute for International and Security Affairs (SWP), member of the council
 German-Polish-Ukrainian Society (GPUS), member of the advisory board
 Global Zero Commission, Member  
 Stockholm International Peace Research Institute (SIPRI), member of the governing board
 Turkey: Culture of Change Initiative (TCCI), member of the advisory board
 Walther Rathenau Institute, member of the advisory board
 World Economic Forum (WEF), member of the Global Future Council on the Future of International Security
 International Crisis Group (ICG), member of the board of trustees (-2018)

Since 2011, Ischinger also acts as advisor to Fair Observer on global politics and security topics.

Recognition
 2018 – Nunn-Lugar Award for Promoting Nuclear Security
 2016 – Order of the Rising Sun, 2nd class
 2010 – Order of Merit of Baden-Württemberg
 2009 – Order of Merit of the Federal Republic of Germany
 2008 – Leo Baeck Medal (Leo Baeck Institute) for humanitarian work promoting tolerance and social justice (awarded by James D. Wolfensohn and Ambassador Richard C. Holbrooke)

Personal life
Ischinger is married to Jutta Falke, a journalist and writer, and the couple have one child. Ischinger also has two children from a previous marriage with Barbara Ischinger (born 1949). Before departing from Berlin to Washington, D.C., in 2001, Jutta Falke-Ischinger was the Berlin bureau chief of the German weekly "Rheinischer Merkur".

References

External links

German Foreign Office
Munich Security Conference

1946 births
Living people
Ambassadors of Germany to the United States
Ambassadors of Germany to the United Kingdom
University of Bonn alumni
People from Esslingen (district)
Officers Crosses of the Order of Merit of the Federal Republic of Germany
Recipients of the Order of Merit of Baden-Württemberg
Recipients of the Order of the Cross of Terra Mariana, 2nd Class
Recipients of the Order of the Rising Sun, 2nd class
The Fletcher School at Tufts University alumni